Controlled Demolition, Inc. (CDI) is a controlled demolition firm headquartered in Phoenix, Maryland. The firm was founded by Jack Loizeaux who used dynamite to remove tree stumps in the Baltimore, Maryland area, and moved on to using explosives to take down chimneys, overpasses and small buildings in the 1940s. The company has demolished several notable buildings by implosion, including the Gettysburg National Tower, the Seattle Kingdome, and the uncollapsed portion of the Champlain Towers South condominium.

Records

Selected projects

Alfred P. Murrah Building, Oklahoma City
On May 24, 1995, the firm was responsible for the demolition of the Alfred P. Murrah Federal Building after its bombing on April 19, 1995.

The Seattle Kingdome

The total cost for the demolition project was $9 million. The firm planned the collapse of the roof to prevent its simultaneous free fall, creating a delay pattern that would break the roof into pieces and setting up 15-foot-high earth berms on the floor of the stadium to absorb the impact of the falling concrete. The demolition of the Kingdome established the record for the largest structure, by volume, ever demolished with explosives.

Gettysburg National Tower
CDI demolished the Gettysburg National Tower on July 3, 2000, which was the 137th anniversary of the final day of the Battle of Gettysburg. The demolition was done for free for the National Park Service.

World Trade Center Site
On September 22, 2001, eleven days after the 9/11 attacks, a preliminary cleanup plan for the World Trade Center site was delivered by Controlled Demolition, Inc. in which Mark Loizeaux, president of CDI, emphasized the importance of protecting the slurry wall (or "the bathtub") which kept the Hudson River from flooding the WTC's basement.

Cape Canaveral Air Force Station Space Launch Complex 40
The tower was disassembled during late 2007 and early 2008. Demolition of the Mobile Service Structure (MSS), by means of a controlled explosion, occurred on 2008-04-27. National Geographic Channel: Man Made: Rocket Tower has a full episode on the demolition

Martin Tower
Martin Tower, the 21-story world headquarters building of defunct Bethlehem Steel and the tallest building in Bethlehem, Pennsylvania, was imploded by Controlled Demolition on May 19, 2019, at a reported cost of $575,000.

Champlain Towers South 
The company was contracted to demolish the remaining portion of the 12-story condominium building near Miami Beach, Florida, after it partially collapsed on June 24, 2021; the work was expedited due to the potential threat of Hurricane Elsa. The demolition occurred on July 4, 2021, after only a day of preparation, including placement of explosives; city officials had feared that the demolition could take weeks. As the still-standing structure was unstable, it was considered unsafe to enter and CDI had originally estimated that the demolition could not occur until the following day, since the work had to be done carefully and slowly to avoid a premature collapse. This risk of collapse and its risk to rescuers warranted the controlled demolition, which was directed away from the original collapse footprint.

Other projects
Pruitt–Igoe
Traymore Hotel
Woodmen of the World Building
Marlborough-Blenheim Hotel
Hotel Manger
Hotel Charlotte
Dunes Hotel and Casino
Landmark Hotel and Casino
Sands Hotel and Casino
Farmers Bank Building
Omni Coliseum
Omega Tower Trelew
J. L. Hudson Department Store and Addition
Lake Michigan High-Rises
St. Louis Arena
Three Rivers Stadium
Market Square Arena
Sands Atlantic City
RCA Dome
Ocean Tower
Grand Palace Hotel
Queen Lane Apartments
Capital Plaza Office Tower
Trump Plaza Hotel and Casino
Ferrybridge Power Station sub-contracted by Keltbray Decommissioning

References

External links

Controlled Demolition, Inc.
Interview with Stacey Loizeaux by Nova (TV series)
Loizeaux Group, LLC Youtube channel

Companies based in Baltimore County, Maryland
Demolition
American companies established in 1947
1947 establishments in Maryland